Havant and Waterloo was a parliamentary constituency centred on the towns of Havant and Waterlooville in Hampshire.  It returned one Member of Parliament (MP) to the House of Commons of the Parliament of the United Kingdom, elected by the first past the post system.

History 

The constituency was created for the February 1974 general election, and was abolished for the 1983 general election.

Boundaries
The area of the constituency was the same as that of the Havant and Waterloo Urban District, on the south coast of England. The seat covered the semi-urban area in the south east of Hampshire, between the city of Portsmouth and the West Sussex border.

As part of the re-organisation of local government, in 1974–1975, the Urban District was incorporated in the Borough of Havant.

Members of Parliament

Election results

References

Parliamentary constituencies in Hampshire (historic)
Constituencies of the Parliament of the United Kingdom established in 1974
Constituencies of the Parliament of the United Kingdom disestablished in 1983
Havant
Borough of Havant